Kurt Reinhard (27 August 1914 – 18 July 1979) was a German musicologist and ethnomusicologist who specialised in Turkish music.

Born in Gießen, Germany, he studied musicology and composition at the University of Cologne from 1933 to 1935, and ethnology at the Universities of Leipzig and Munich from 1935-1936. He took his doctorate at Munich doing his dissertation on Burmese music. In 1952–1968 he was a director of the Berliner Phonogramm-Archiv.

His chief area of interest in the field of ethnomusicology was the folk music of Turkey.

Partial bibliography
Types of Turkmenian Songs in Turkey, Journal of the International Folk Music Council 9, 1956
On the problem of pre-pentatonic scales: particularly the third-second nucleus, Journal of the International Folk Music Council 10, 1958
Türkische Musik, Berlin, 1962
"Türkische Musik", in Musik in Geschichte und Gegenwart, 1966
Musique de Turquie (in French, with Ursula Reinhard), Buchet/Chastel (Paris), 1996

German ethnomusicologists
1914 births
1979 deaths
Ludwig Maximilian University of Munich alumni
20th-century German musicologists